Aceh Utara FC stands for Aceh Utara Football Club is an  Indonesian football club based in North Aceh Regency, Aceh. Club played in Liga 3.

References

External links
Liga-Indonesia.co.id
 

North Aceh Regency
Football clubs in Indonesia
Football clubs in Aceh
Association football clubs established in 2000
2000 establishments in Indonesia